James Drummond McGregor (1 September 1838 – 4 March 1918) was a Canadian businessman, politician, and the tenth Lieutenant Governor of Nova Scotia.

Born in New Glasgow, Nova Scotia, the son of Roderick MacGregor and Janet Chisholm, both of Scottish descent, he was mayor of New Glasgow from 1879 to 1880. In 1867, MacGregor married Elizabeth McColl. He represented Pictou County in the Nova Scotia House of Assembly from 1890 to 1894 and from 1897 to 1900. MacGregor married Roberta Ridley in 1894. In 1900, he ran unsuccessfully for the House of Commons of Canada in the riding of Pictou. MacGregor was appointed to the Senate of Canada in 1903 representing the senatorial division of New Glasgow, Nova Scotia. A Liberal, he resigned in 1910 when he was appointed lieutenant governor of Nova Scotia. He served until 1915. MacGregor died in New Glasgow at the age of 79.

His son Robert also represented Pictou County in the provincial assembly.

External links
 
 

1838 births
1918 deaths
Canadian senators from Nova Scotia
Candidates in the 1900 Canadian federal election
Lieutenant Governors of Nova Scotia
Mayors of places in Nova Scotia
Nova Scotia Liberal Party MLAs
People from New Glasgow, Nova Scotia
Liberal Party of Canada candidates for the Canadian House of Commons